Secret Town is an unincorporated community in Placer County, California.

Name 
After gold was discovered in this area, miners wanted to keep the location a secret, hence the unusual name.

Railway bridge 

The 1100 ft (335 m) long and 95 ft (29 m) high Secret Town wooden trestle on the Central Pacific Railroad's grade, like most of the other trestles of the line, was filled in with earth and rock after the railroad opened to traffic and could afford to send Chinese laborers back to improve the right-of-way by reducing the risk of catching fire from smokestack sparks as steam locomotives crossed.

References

Unincorporated communities in California
Unincorporated communities in Placer County, California
Railroad bridges in California